Alhambra Theatre is a theatre building in Portland, Oregon, in the United States. The venue was originally called the Alhambra upon its completion in 1913; Subsequent names included Sabala's, the Mt. Tabor Legacy, and Mt. Tabor Theater. Alhambra Theatre was named after a now extinct volcano within Portland's city limits. In April 2016, the venue was permanently closed and subsequently became the QuarterWorld Arcade.

References

External links
 
 http://www.portlandmercury.com/blogtown/2016/04/08/17842087/quarterworld-portlands-got-a-new-arcade

1913 establishments in Oregon
Buildings and structures in Portland, Oregon
Sunnyside, Portland, Oregon
Theatres completed in 1913
Theatres in Portland, Oregon